Zoramthanga (also known as Zoram Thanga or T. Zoramthanga, born as Run Nawn Thang, 1963  – 9 February 2005) was an amateur boxer who is remembered as the first Indian to win a bronze medal at the Boxing World Cup.

Biography 

Zoramthanga was born Run Nawn to a Chin family in Selawn village near the town of Falam in Chin State, Myanmar. His family moved to Tithim village near Tahan-Kalaymyo. There he joined the Myanmar Army and took up boxing.

To further his career, Zoramthanga moved to Mizoram in India, changing his name and jumpstarting his boxing career in 1985. He won a gold medal at the Mizoram-Myanmar Champhai Border Championships in his weight category the same year.

Zoramthanga participated in several national and international boxing championships for Mizoram and India. He fared well at the World Amateur Boxing Championships in Moscow in 1989, where he reached the quarter finals, before losing to Rogelio Marcelo.

As a flyweight, he represented India at the 1990 Commonwealth Games in Auckland. In his first bout, he defeated Pupuke Robati of the Cook Islands before losing his second fight to Nokuthula Tshabangu of Zimbabwe.

His greatest success came at the 6th Boxing World Cup in Mumbai in 1990, where he won a bronze medal in the light flyweight category. He defeated Jin Yang of South Korea on points in the preliminaries, and Paul Weir of Scotland in the quarterfinals, also on points. He lost to eventual champion Eric Griffin of United States in the semi-finals on points. However, unlike most amateur boxing tournaments, the Boxing World Cup had a third place play-off to decide the bronze medal position. Zoramthanga defeated fellow Indian boxer Dhamendar Yadav 17–4 on points to clinch the bronze medal. This was India's first medal in an international boxing tournament outside the Asian Games.

Following the win, the Government of Mizoram made him the Sports Promotion Officer of the state. He retired from boxing in 1992. He held the post of Sports Promotion Officer until he died abruptly of hypertension at the Lunglei Civil Hospital in Lunglei, Mizoram on 9 February 2005. He was survived by his wife and three children.

References

Boxers at the 1990 Commonwealth Games
Commonwealth Games competitors for India
Flyweight boxers
Indian male boxers
Burmese male boxers
Mizo people
People from Chin State
1963 births
2005 deaths